The Shepherd Public School District is located in the Village of Shepherd in southern Isabella County in Michigan. Most students are transported to school on one of the district's 29 buses. The district is classified as Class B and has an approximate total enrollment of 1,800 students and about 120 certified staff.

Shepherd Elementary School has about 601 students in grades K-5 and is located across the street from the high school. There are 26 full-time classroom teachers. More information may be found at the elementary web site. 

There are 6 teachers and about 131 students. See the Winn web site for more information. 

Shepherd Middle School, near downtown Shepherd, has about 426 students and 26 full-time classroom teachers. Shepherd Middle School may also be visited at its web site. 

Shepherd High School has about 504 students and 35 full-time teachers. Since the Middle School and High School are physically connected, students share a few amenities such as the media center, cafeteria, band and choir rooms, and computer labs. 

Shepherd Public Schools also has an Alternative Education Program for middle and high school age students. This program is located at Odyssey Middle/High School on Wise Road in the school forest. Four teachers provide education to about 70 students.
Our school also has the opportunity for the students to take classes through Mount Pleasant Technical Center. Many have attended this program and really enjoyed the chance to learn hands on experience in the career they are interested in.

External links 

School districts in Michigan
Education in Isabella County, Michigan